Kalbine Sor (Greek: Τη Καρδιά Σου Ρώτα; English: Ask Your Heart) is an EP by Greek recording artist Katy Garbi and Turkish recording artist Burak Kut. The EP was released digitally on 17 December 2015 via Turkish record label 2645 Records.

Track listing

Release history

References

External links
Official website

2015 EPs
Greek-language albums
Turkish-language albums
Katy Garbi albums
Burak Kut albums
Albums free for download by copyright owner